Mount Süphan is a stratovolcano located in eastern Turkey, immediately north of Lake Van.

The mountain has two peaks, east and west, separated by a 1.5 km-wide basin; there are two small lakes in this basin. The eastern summit is much larger in area and consists of "a wide snow-covered platform of cairn-like bare rock peaks". From here, the whole northern shore of Lake Van is visible, along with Mount Ararat, the Murat Su plain, and even the Palandöken Dag south of Erzurum. The smaller western summit has fields of lava boulders. A narrow ridge connects the two peaks. All sides of the mountain are marked by lava "ribs". The slope is fairly gentle on all sides except the north.

The remains of the small Urartian fort of Kefirkalesi are located on the southwest slope at a height of 2400 m. This was probably never intended to have a permanent garrison and was mostly to keep local nomadic groups in check. Today, there are a few small villages along the mountain's lower slopes. About 1.5 km west of the village of Harmantepe (formerly Norsunçuk), there is also an ancient cemetery with urns that may have once contained cremated remains.

Gallery

See also
 List of volcanoes in Turkey

References

External links
 Mount Süphan - map

Mountains of Turkey
Stratovolcanoes of Turkey
Landforms of Bitlis Province
Four-thousanders of the Armenian Highland
Four-thousanders of Asia
Pleistocene stratovolcanoes